Katherine Marie Heigl (born November 24, 1978) is an American actress and former fashion model. She played Dr. Izzie Stevens on the ABC television medical drama Grey's Anatomy from 2005 to 2010, a role that brought her recognition and accolades, including the Primetime Emmy Award for Outstanding Supporting Actress in a Drama Series in 2007.

Heigl started her career as a child model with Wilhelmina Models before turning her attention to acting, making her film debut in That Night (1992) and later appearing in My Father the Hero (1994) as well as Under Siege 2: Dark Territory (1995). She then landed the role of Isabel Evans on The WB television series Roswell (1999–2002), for which she received nominations for Saturn and Teen Choice Awards. 

She then starred in commercially successful romantic comedy films such as Knocked Up (2007), 27 Dresses (2008), The Ugly Truth (2009), Killers (2010), Life As We Know It (2010) and New Year's Eve (2011). She also appeared in Zyzzyx Road (2006), One for the Money (2012), The Big Wedding (2013), and Unforgettable (2017). Heigl has also starred in several films that have seen limited releases, including Jackie & Ryan (2014), Home Sweet Hell (2015), and Jenny's Wedding (2015).

She is also executive producer on her leading television roles, which include the short-lived NBC television series State of Affairs from 2014 to 2015, the Netflix series Firefly Lane (2021–present) and the upcoming limited series Woodhull. She has also lent her voice to the animated film The Nut Job (2014) and its 2017 sequel. Heigl also had a main role in the final two seasons of the USA Network series Suits (2018–2019). 

Additionally, Heigl has established herself as a cover model, appearing in numerous publications including Maxim, Vanity Fair, and Cosmopolitan.

Early life
Heigl was born in Washington, D.C., in Columbia Hospital for Women. She is the youngest of four children of Nancy (née Engelhardt), a personal manager, and Paul Heigl, a financial executive and accountant. Her father is of Irish and German ancestry (including Swiss-German), and her mother is of German descent. Heigl lived in Northern Virginia and then Denver, before her family moved to the town of New Canaan, Connecticut, when Katherine was five, and where she lived the rest of her childhood.

In 1986, her older brother Jason died of injuries suffered in a car accident, after being thrown from the back of a pickup truck while out for lunch with some of his high school classmates. Her brother's death led Heigl's Lutheran mother and Catholic father to convert to the Church of Jesus Christ of Latter-day Saints and Heigl, then eight, was reared in that faith.

Career

1992–1998: Early work
When Heigl was nine, her aunt, along with her parents, sent photos of her to a modeling agency. Within a few weeks, she was signed with Wilhelmina Models as a child model. Soon after she was signed with the agency, a client picked her for use in a magazine ad, where she made her modeling debut. At the time, Heigl was earning $75 an hour posing for Sears and Lord & Taylor catalogs. The first time Heigl appeared in a national television ad was for Cheerios cereal.

Heigl began studying acting and made her film debut in That Night (1992). She played Christina Sebastian in Steven Soderbergh's Depression-era drama King of the Hill before being cast in her first leading role in the 1994 comedy My Father the Hero. During this time, Heigl continued to attend New Canaan High School, balancing her film and modeling work with her academic studies. Heigl dropped out of New Canaan High School after her sophomore year to pursue her career in Hollywood.

In 1995, she starred in the Steven Seagal action thriller Under Siege 2: Dark Territory. Heigl portrayed a 16-year-old traveling by train through the mountains with her uncle Casey Ryback (Seagal), an ex-SEAL counter-terrorist expert, in order to visit the grave of her deceased father. The train is hijacked by mercenaries in Colorado, who keep Heigl's character as a hostage. Much of her work in the film was opposite Morris Chestnut, Sandra Taylor and Everett McGill. Despite an increased focus on acting, Heigl still modeled extensively, appearing regularly in magazines such as Seventeen.

She landed the lead role in Disney's made-for-television film Wish Upon a Star in 1996, portraying two body-swapping characters along with Danielle Harris. That year Heigl's parents divorced, and her mother was diagnosed with cancer. After her high school graduation in 1997, Heigl moved into a four-bedroom house in Malibu Canyon, California with her mother, who also became her manager. In 1998, she co-starred with Peter Fonda in the television movie The Tempest, an adaptation of William Shakespeare's play of the same name. The setting of the film was changed to Civil War Mississippi. She also starred in the horror film Bride of Chucky.

1999–2004: Roswell and television movies 
In 1999, Heigl turned her attention to television when she accepted the role of Isabel Evans on the science fiction TV drama Roswell, a role that was expanded in the show's second and third seasons. Heigl had auditioned for all three of the show's female leads (the other two roles eventually went to Shiri Appleby and Majandra Delfino) before she was finally cast as Isabel, an alien-human hybrid. Heigl was frequently featured in photo essays in magazines such as Life, TV Guide, and Teen as well as FHM. She appeared in the FHM and Maxim calendars, FHM'''s annual "100 Sexiest Women in the World", and was featured in the Girls of Maxim Gallery. In May 2006, Maxim awarded her #12 on their annual Hot 100 List as well as voted the 19th "Sexiest Woman in the World" by readers of FHM magazine. While Roswell was in production, Heigl worked on several films, including 100 Girls, an independent 2001 film, and Valentine, a horror film starring David Boreanaz and Denise Richards.

Heigl accepted a role in Ground Zero, a television thriller scheduled to be telecast that fall which was based on the bestselling James Mills novel The Seventh Power, in the spring of 2001. She co-starred as a brilliant and politically-concerned college student who helps to build a nuclear device to illustrate the need for a change in national priorities. The device ends up in the hands of a terrorist following betrayal by a fellow student. However, after the September 11, 2001, terrorist attacks, the film was shelved as its plot was considered inappropriate. It was released in 2003 under the title Critical Assembly. After the 9/11 attacks, Heigl recorded a public service announcement for the American Red Cross to help raise money for victims.

In 2003, Heigl appeared in three television movies, including the horror genre , a modern-day variation on the Frankenstein story co-starring Thomas Gibson; and Love Comes Softly for Hallmark Entertainment as Marty Claridge, a young, newlywed traveling west, and reprised her role in the sequel Love's Enduring Promise the next year. Heigl played Isabella Linton in MTV's modern revamp of Emily Brontë's Wuthering Heights. In October 2003, Heigl was cast opposite Johnny Knoxville in The Ringer, a Farrelly brothers comedy that was released in December 2005. Heigl starred as Romy in the 2005 television film Romy and Michele: In the Beginning, a prequel to the 1997 film Romy and Michele's High School Reunion.

2005–2010: Grey's Anatomy and breakthrough
In 2005, Heigl was cast in what would become her highest-profile role to date, as medical intern Dr. Isobel "Izzie" Stevens on the ABC medical drama Grey's Anatomy. The show, initially a mid-season replacement, became a huge ratings success and one of the highest-rated series on broadcast TV. The same year, Heigl landed the starring role in the independent film Side Effects (2005), a romantic comedy about marketing and the pharmaceutical industry, for which she was also executive producer. A year later, Heigl was nominated for the Golden Globe Award for Best Supporting Actress – Series, Miniseries, or Television Film for her work on Grey's Anatomy.

Heigl also starred in Zyzzyx Road; filmed in 2004 and not released until 2006; it has been cited as the lowest-grossing feature film of all time.

In 2007, Heigl had her high-profile film breakthrough with Knocked Up (2007), a comedy from writer/director Judd Apatow, opposite Seth Rogen, Paul Rudd, and Apatow's real-life wife, Leslie Mann. Upon its June 2007 theatrical release, the film received generally positive reviews from critics and proved to be a box office success and a summer romcom hit. The fees Heigl commanded increased after the film's success. The movie grossed $148,761,765 in the U.S., for which she earned a salary of US$300,000. Heigl's role in the film transformed her into Hollywood's new “It girl” according to Vanity Fair.

On September 16, 2007, Heigl won the Primetime Emmy Award for Outstanding Supporting Actress in a Drama Series for her role as Izzie Stevens on Grey's Anatomy. In her acceptance speech, she said that even her mother didn't think she would win. When her name was called for the award, her exclamation of "Shit!" was censored.

Heigl starred with James Marsden in the film 27 Dresses, for which she received US$6 million. The New York Post expressed some disappointment with the mismatch of Heigl's talent and the film's "chick-flick" triviality, suggesting Heigl might be more compatible "with female directors such as Kimberly Peirce (Boys Don't Cry) or Tamara Jenkins (The Savages)...". Heigl was announced the Most Desirable Woman of 2008, according to AskMen.com.

Anne Fletcher, the director of 27 Dresses described her as having the “‘It’ factor”. She explained further, “You can't buy it; you can't learn it; you can't create it; it just is. We haven't had one of her in many years. Julia Roberts, Sandra Bullock, Meg Ryan— those have been our go-to girls for romantic comedy for a very long time, but we haven't had a new one. Katie has beauty, vulnerability, identifiability. She's funny, charming, lovely to watch. Her slightest eye movement is captivating; you know instantly what's going on.”

In a highly publicized Vanity Fair interview, Heigl admitted that though she enjoyed working with Apatow and Rogen when she starred in Knocked Up, she had a hard time enjoying the film itself. She called the movie "a little sexist", claiming that the film "paints the women as shrews, as humorless and uptight, and it paints the men as lovable, goofy, fun-loving guys." Apatow and Rogen were reportedly not pleased with Heigl's interview, as Rogen said that he enjoyed working with Heigl and was stung by her comments.

Heigl's comments generated a widespread reaction in the media. In an interview with People magazine, Heigl said:

My motive was to encourage other women like myself to not take that element of the movie too seriously, and to remember that it's a broad comedy"; and added, "Although I stand behind my opinion, I'm disheartened that it has become the focus of my experience with the movie."

There was some speculation that Heigl might be leaving Grey's Anatomy after the end of the 2008–2009 season. This speculation revolved around her refusal to submit her name for Emmy consideration for the previous season. Heigl had disagreements with the character's direction in the fourth season, deeming the storyline involving Izzie's affair with George a "ratings ploy" that served to be "shocking" and others speculated she would leave due to the time devotion in producing a film version of Carolyn Jessop's book Escape.

Heigl said publicly that she'd opted out of the Emmy race that year because she felt the material she'd received didn't warrant Emmy consideration. The comment reportedly angered the show's producers and writers, who interpreted it as a slight on their work. Grey's showrunner Shonda Rhimes said she was not insulted by Heigl's Emmy withdrawal, and noted that Heigl's character was downplayed during the season because Heigl had asked for a lighter work schedule. Despite Heigl's reported displeasure with the previous season, and persistent rumors that her character had died, ABC confirmed that Heigl would return for the sixth season of Grey's.

Heigl starred with Gerard Butler in The Ugly Truth (2009). The film was made on a budget of $38 million and earned $205 million at the worldwide box office.

Speculation as to whether Heigl would leave Grey's Anatomy persisted through most of season six. On March 11, 2010, Heigl reportedly did not show up for work on the show, and Heigl and series creator Shonda Rhimes subsequently reached an agreement to immediately release Heigl from her contract. As a result, Heigl's appearance on the January 21 episode of Grey's Anatomy was her final appearance of that season and, thus far, in the series. Heigl said that she left the show to focus not on her film career, but on her family. The backlash over Heigl's comments on Knocked Up and Grey's Anatomy has given Heigl a reputation of being difficult to work with which was seen to have damaged her career.

2010–13: Further rom-com roles
In June 2010, Heigl starred in the Lionsgate comedy-thriller Killers, with Ashton Kutcher. She next starred in and produced the big-screen drama Life As We Know It, directed by Greg Berlanti, which revolved around a woman and a man whose respective best friends die in a car accident. Following the deaths, they begin to share in caring for their late friends' orphaned daughter. Heigl received $12 million for both films.

In 2011, Heigl appeared in the ensemble romantic comedy New Year's Eve, directed by Garry Marshall. Despite being a commercial success, grossing over $142 million worldwide, the film received generally negative reviews. Heigl next had the lead role in One for the Money (2012). Based on a series of novels by Janet Evanovich, the film's lead character is Stephanie Plum, a bounty hunter working for a bonding company. The film was a financial failure, grossing just over $36 million worldwide against its production budget of $40 million. For her performance, Heigl received a Golden Raspberry Award nomination for Worst Actress.

In January 2012, Heigl disclosed her enthusiastic desires to reprise her role on Grey's Anatomy and wrap up Izzie's storyline, conceiving an idea of her success in another hospital after floundering in the fictional Seattle Grace hospital where she was 'one step behind the eight ball'. She admitted to regretting leaving the show. She complimented the great work environment and family dynamic of the cast but also stated, "I completely understand if it doesn't necessarily work ... They've got a lot of storylines going on there."

In 2013, she appeared alongside Robert De Niro, Susan Sarandon and Diane Keaton in The Big Wedding, a comedy about an estranged family reuniting for a ceremony. A very poor critical and commercial reception greeted the film upon its release—it holds a 7% rating on film review aggregator Rotten Tomatoes and only made US$7.5 million in its opening weekend—and for her role, Heigl was nominated for Worst Supporting Actress at the 34th Golden Raspberry Awards. In June 2013, she began appearing in a television commercial for Vicks' ZzzQuil.

2014–19: departure from romcoms and television resurgence
In 2014, Heigl admitted to Marie Claire magazine that while she loves romantic comedies and was “so stoked to be doing them”, she “hit it a little too hard,” professing “I couldn't say no. There's nothing wrong with them, but maybe I overloaded my audience. I should have done a superhero movie or a psychological thriller.” During this period of time, Heigl broke away from her conventional romcom roles, pursuing romantic dramas, doing voiceover work, dark comedies and returning to dramatic television.

Heigl starred in the romantic drama Jackie & Ryan (2014), opposite Ben Barnes, portraying a recent single mom battling to hold onto her daughter and the love interest of a modern-day train hopper. The film was released in a limited release and through video on demand by Entertainment One in the United States. She also voice-acted the squirrel Andie in the animated film The Nut Job  which was released on January 17, 2014. She reprised her role in its 2017 sequel, The Nut Job 2: Nutty by Nature which was released theatrically on August 11, 2017.

She next starred as a rejected and jealous housewife in the dark comedy Home Sweet Hell (2015), alongside Patrick Wilson and Jordana Brewster. Released for VOD and a limited theatrical run in North America, the film received largely negative reviews. Variety wrote in its verdict: "Considering how often [Heigl] has been slammed for not being just another docile, eager-to-please female celebrity, it's hard not to suspect that she might have relished the chance to play an unapologetically ball-busting shrew—a grotesquely exaggerated version of a stereotype she's been assigned many times over. Indeed, Heigl's performance as a coolly murderous model housewife is the only real reason to even consider watching Home Sweet Hell, an otherwise flailing and risible tale of adultery, extortion and suburban malaise that suggests a poor woman's Gone Girl". She received a Golden Raspberry Award nomination for Worst Actress.

In 2015, Heigl starred as the titular role in the independent film Jenny's Wedding, about a woman who finally decides to get married, but her choice of partner tears her conventional family apart. An Indiegogo campaign was later launched to help raise money for post-production costs, and like Heigl's previous few projects, the film was distributed for a VOD and limited release in certain parts of the United States only.

She starred opposite Rosario Dawson and Geoff Stults in the erotic thriller Unforgettable (2017), portraying a divorcée who torments the new fiancée of her ex-husband. The film was her first wide release in three years; it garnered mediocre reviews and grossed a paltry US$4.7 million in its opening weekend. Nevertheless, The Globe and Mail remarked that "Heigl works overtime to humanize the resentful mom—her face is like an old-fashioned cash register with the prices popping up—but she's more fun to watch as the story grows ugly and violent, and she unleashes the demon within".

Heigl's lead roles in the 2014–15 NBC political drama series State of Affairs and CBS 2017 legal drama Doubt were both cancelled after one season. However, unlike State of Affairs, Doubt premiered to what was described as "tepid" ratings by The Hollywood Reporter, and CBS announced its cancellation after just two episodes, later burning out its episodes.

Heigl returned to form when she was cast in the USA Network legal drama series Suits, playing the role of Samantha Wheeler, a new partner at the fictional law firm of Zane Specter Litt. Heigl remained on the show for its final two seasons.

2020–present: professional expansion, Firefly Lane and Woodhull
Heigl was later cast in the leading role opposite Sarah Chalke and Ben Lawson for the Netflix show Firefly Lane, released in 2021. Heigl is also executive producer. The series was a success and renewed for a second season. Also that year, Heigl co-starred in Fear of Rain, a psychological thriller written and directed by Castille Landon. Harry Connick Jr., Madison Iseman and Israel Broussard completed the cast. In December 2020, it was announced that Heigl will star and executive produce again with the limited series Woodhull. She is set to portray the first female candidate for the presidency of the United States, Victoria Woodhull.

In January 2021, Heigl declared in an interview with The Washington Post promoting Firefly Lane that she was "done apologizing" for her past reputation and criticized being labelled as "difficult" in the late 2000s and early 2010s. She also acknowledged how it may have impacted her career. Her 27 Dresses co-star James Marsden defended the actress' "courage" and "strong convictions" and remarked unsurprise at her career expanding role in executive production. In September 2021, she endorsed the IATSE strike and remarked heavy criticism for speaking up about the harsh working conditions on the set of Grey's Anatomy'' that the crew endured, while also commenting on health and safety failures in long-hour productions. In 2022, her former co-star Ellen Pompeo stated in a podcast that Heigl would have been branded a "hero" today for her 2009 remarks about their 17-hour workday. She further stated, "But she’s ahead of her time, made a statement about our crazy hours and of course, [it was like] ‘Let’s slam a woman and call her ungrateful.'"

Personal life
In June 2006, Heigl became engaged to singer Josh Kelley, whom she had met a year earlier on the set of his music video for "Only You". They chose not to live together before they were married, with Heigl later explaining, "I think I just wanted to save something for the actual marriage... I wanted there to be something to make the actual marriage different than the dating or the courtship." They were married on December 23, 2007, in Park City, Utah. They live with their children in Oakley, Utah.

In September 2009, the couple adopted a daughter from South Korea, the birthplace of Heigl's sister Meg. She was born with a heart defect and underwent open-heart surgery before leaving Korea. In April 2012, Kelley and Heigl adopted a second daughter from the U.S. In June 2016, the couple announced that they were expecting their third child. Heigl gave birth to a son on December 20, 2016.

Heigl's brother-in-law is singer Charles Kelley of the country music trio Lady A.

Charity work
Heigl has worked with Best Friends Animal Society on several projects, including their Pup My Ride program. The program transports small dogs from high-kill animal shelters to other parts of the US where there is a higher demand for such dogs. She gave a grant to Best Friends to fund a year of the program. Heigl and her mother, Nancy, started Heigl's Hounds of Hope, which operates as part of the Jason Debus Heigl Foundation.

The Foundation was created in honor of Heigl's brother, who was killed in a car accident in 1986 at the age of fifteen. Heigl's Hounds of Hope rescues larger dogs with behavior problems from shelters with a high kill rate. It rehabilitates them through training and other adjustments to make them suitable for re-homing. As of 2014, Heigl has eight dogs of her own.

In 2010, Heigl was honored with the "Presidential Service Award" by ASPCA for her work and dedication to animal welfare. In 2011, Heigl launched the "I Hate Balls" Campaign, focused on promoting spay/neuter of pets, to help save the lives of millions of companion animals. The initiative features a Public Service Announcement starring Heigl and produced by Funny or Die. In 2012, on behalf of PETA, she signed a letter to members of the Utah legislature, urging them to reject a law that would make undercover filming in factory farms a criminal offense.

In the same year, Heigl was honored by "Congressional Coalition on Adoption Institute (CCAI)" for her dedication and commitment to adoption, and by the American Cancer Society for her work in helping to amplify the awareness of cancer-related issues through her public support of her mother's journey with the disease.

Heigl is a strong proponent of organ donation, working as a spokesperson for Donate Life America. After the death of her brother Jason, Heigl's family chose to donate Jason's organs to people needing organ transplants. Heigl was inspired by these events to later work as an activist for organ donation.

Filmography

Film

Television

Awards and nominations

References

External links

 
 
 
 
 Jason Debus Heigl Foundation
 Katherine Heigl at 2019 Golden Heart Luncheon 

1978 births
Living people
20th-century American actresses
21st-century American actresses
Actresses from Connecticut
Actresses from Virginia
American child actresses
American child models
American film actresses
Latter Day Saints from Connecticut
American people of Irish descent
American people of Swiss-German descent
American television actresses
Outstanding Performance by a Supporting Actress in a Drama Series Primetime Emmy Award winners
People from New Canaan, Connecticut
American women television producers
Actresses from Washington, D.C.
People from Oakley, Utah
American women film producers
Film producers from Connecticut
Television producers from Connecticut